The CONCACAF (Confederation of North, Central American, and Caribbean Association Football) qualification stage for the 2010 FIFA World Cup in South Africa consisted of 35 national teams competing for the three berths given automatically to CONCACAF by FIFA. The United States, Mexico and Honduras qualified. The fourth-place finisher, Costa Rica, played a two-game playoff with the CONMEBOL fifth-place finisher, Uruguay, for a possible fourth berth.

Format
The First and Second Rounds reduced the 35 entrants to 24 and 12 teams, respectively. The remaining 12 teams were then placed into three Third Round groups of four, with the top two teams in each group advancing to the fourth and final qualification group. The Third Round began in August 2008 and ended in November 2008. The top three teams from the Fourth Round group of six (held from February to October 2009) qualified for the 2010 FIFA World Cup. The fourth-placed team competed in a home-and-away playoff against the 5th-place team from CONMEBOL.

Seeding
The draw took place on 25 November 2007 in Durban, South Africa and it determined the fixtures for the preliminary rounds. In addition, because second round winners are paired off for the third round, the top 13 seeds have been subdivided as follows:

 Pot A: The top 3 teams, who would be top seeds of each third round group.
 Pot B: The next 3 teams, who would be the seconds seeds of the third round groups.
 Pot C: The next 6 teams, who would receive a bye to the second round, and would not be drawn against a Pot A or Pot B team in that round.
 Pot D: St. Vincent and the Grenadines, who also receive a bye in the first round, but would be paired against one of the top 12 teams in Round 2.

In the second round, the 13 top-ranked CONCACAF teams from the May 2007 FIFA World Ranking joined 11 winners from the first round.

First round

The 22 teams ranked 14 to 35 competed in the First Round. Teams ranked 14th–24th were randomly drawn against teams ranked 25th–35th. Teams played home and away against their opponents, except three ties: Puerto Rico–Dominican Republic, Grenada–U.S. Virgin Islands and Montserrat–Suriname, which were played over one leg in late March due to several Member Associations failing to meet the new FIFA Stadium standards and being unable to secure a home venue. The winners advanced to the Second Round.

|-
!colspan="5"| Group 1

|-
!colspan="5"| Group 2

|-
!colspan="5"| Group 3

|}

1 Belize moved their home leg to Guatemala.

2 Both legs played in the Bahamas.

3 Played as one leg due to a lack of acceptable grounds for FIFA competition.

4 Played as one leg at Trinidad and Tobago because neither side are able to provide a suitable venue according to FIFA's guidelines.

5 Played in the United States because Anguilla's stadium is not a suitable venue.

Second round

In the Second Round, the 11 first round winners joined the 13 teams which received a bye to the Second Round. Teams ranked 1st–12th were randomly drawn against the unseeded teams (the 11 first round winners plus Saint Vincent and the Grenadines, which was ranked 13th). Teams played home and away against their opponents and the winners advanced to the next round. Matches took place in June 2008.

|-
!colspan="5"| Group 1

|-
!colspan="5"| Group 2

|-
!colspan="5"| Group 3

|}

1 Saint Lucia moved their home leg to the United States.

2 Belize moved their home leg to the United States.

3 Bahamas moved their home leg to Jamaica.

4 Order of legs reversed subsequent to original draw.

Third round

The winners from the Second Round were placed into three groups of four teams, where they played a double round robin home and away schedule. The top two teams from each group advanced to the Fourth Round.

Group 1

Group 2

Group 3

Fourth round

The six teams that reached the fourth round formed one double-round-robin, home-and-away group nicknamed the "Hexagonal." The top three teams qualified for the 2010 FIFA World Cup. The fourth place team qualified for a home-and-away play-off against the fifth-place team from CONMEBOL.

The allocation of teams in the draw took place in Johannesburg, South Africa on 22 November 2008.

Inter-confederation play-offs

The 4th place team played the 5th place team from the CONMEBOL (South American Zone) Qualification in a home and away play-off. The winner of this play-off qualified for the 2010 FIFA World Cup.

The draw for the order in which the two matches were played was held on 2 June 2009 during the FIFA Congress in Nassau, the Bahamas. The CONCACAF side played the first leg at home.

Qualified teams
The following three teams from CONCACAF qualified for the final tournament.

1 Bold indicates champions for that year. Italic indicates hosts for that year.

Goalscorers
A total of 350 goals were scored over 111 games(including 2 international play-offs), for an average of 3.15 goals per game.
8 goals

 Rudis Corrales

7 goals

 Carlos Pavón
 Luton Shelton

6 goals

 Ali Gerba
 Bryan Ruiz
 Eliseo Quintanilla
 Carlos Ruíz
 Carlo Costly
 Jozy Altidore

5 goals

 Celso Borges
 Wensley Christoph
 Clint Dempsey

4 goals

 Álvaro Saborío 
 Roberto Linares
 Ronald Cerritos
 Rodolfo Zelaya
 Ricky Charles 
 David Suazo 
 Keon Daniel 
 Michael Bradley
 Brian Ching 
 Landon Donovan 

3 goals

 Armando Alonso 
 Shawn Hasani Martin 
 Jason Roberts
 Ramón Núñez 
 Fernando Arce 
 Cuauhtémoc Blanco
 Jared Borgetti 
 Andrés Guardado 
 Pável Pardo
 Carlos Vela 
 Clifton Sandvliet 
 Dwight Yorke

2 goals

 Kerry Skepple 
 Deon McCauley 
 Devaun DeGraff 
 John Barry Nusum 
 Anadale Williams 
 Dwayne De Rosario 
 Alejandro Alpízar 
 Walter Centeno 
 Andy Furtado 
 Froylan Ledezma 
 Roy Myrie 
 Victor Núñez 
 Alonso Solís 
 Jaime Colomé
 Jeniel Márquez
 Jaine Valencia 
 Cristian Castillo
 Julio Martínez 
 Osael Romero 
 William Antonio Torres 
 Mario Rafael Rodríguez 
 Gonzalo Romero 
 Abner Trigueros 
 Julio César de León 
 Amado Guevara 
 Wilson Palacios 
 Deon Burton 
 Marlon King 
 Omar Bravo 
 Guillermo Franco 
 Carlos Salcido 
 Peter Villegas 
 Kenwin McPhee 
 Raydell Schuurman
 Kerry Baptiste 
 Carlos Edwards 
 Cornell Glenn 
 Stern John 
 Kenwyne Jones 
 DaMarcus Beasley
 Carlos Bocanegra 
 Conor Casey 
 Charlie Davies 

1 goal

 Okeem Challenger
 George Dublin 
 Gayson Gregory 
 Tyio Simon 
 Teran Williams 
 Michael Bethel 
 Demont Mitchell 
 Lesly St. Fleur 
 Dwayne Stanford 
 Rashida Williams 
 Harrison Roches 
 Elroy Smith 
 Tyrell Burgess 
 Kwame Steede 
 Rohan Lennon 
 Julián de Guzmán
 Andrew Hainault 
 Issey Nakajima-Farran
 Tomasz Radzinski 
 Adrian Serioux 
 Marshall Forbes 
 Allean Grant 
 Randall Azofeifa 
 Junior Diaz 
 Freddy Fernández 
 Pablo Herrera
 Leonel Duarte 
 Hensy Muñoz 
 Allianni Urgelles 
 Richard Pacquette 
 Luis Alonso Anaya 
 Cesar Larios 
 Carlos Romeo Monteagudo 
 Emerson Umaña 
 Byron Bubb 
 Dorset Langaigne 
 Patrick Modeste
 Shane Rennie 
 Jose Manuel Contreras 
 Carlos Gallardo 
 Marco Pappa 
 Nigel Codrington 
 Frantz Bertin
 Brunel Fucien
 Leonel Saint-Preux
 Alain Vubert 
 Walter Martinez 
 Hendry Thomas 
 Melvin Valladares 
 Omar Cummings 
 Omar Daley 
 Ricardo Fuller 
 Ricardo Gardner 
 Ian Goodison 
 Tyrone Marshall 
 Demar Phillips 
 Andy Williams
 Nery Castillo 
 Israel Castro 
 Giovani dos Santos
 Enrique Esqueda 
 Jonny Magallón
 Rafael Márquez
 Francisco Palencia
 Óscar Rojas 
 Miguel Sabah 
 Matías Vuoso 
 Vladimir Farrell 
 Anton Jongsma
 Tyrone Loran 
 Angelo Zimmerman 
 José Luis Garcés 
 Luis Tejada 
 Chris Megaloudis 
 Orlando Mitchum 
 Gerard Williams
 Titus Elva 
 Gilbert Nihyme 
 Marlon James 
 Kenzo Huur 
 Melvin Valies 
 Germaine Van Dijk 
 Cleon Wondel 
 Russell Latapy 
 Darryl Roberts 
 Collin Samuel 
 Hayden Tinto
 Gavin Glinton 
 David Lowery 
 Freddy Adu 
 Jonathan Bornstein 
 Ricardo Clark
 Kenny Cooper 
 Frankie Hejduk
 Eddie Johnson
 Eddie Lewis 
 Oguchi Onyewu 

1 own goal

 Dario Sierra (against Antigua and Barbuda)
 Daryl Ferguson (against United States)
 Tervor Lennen (against Mexico)
 Marvin González (against Mexico)
 Ricardo Osorio (against Honduras)
 Eugene Martha (against Haiti)
 Marlon Felter (against El Salvador)
 Derrik Garden (against El Salvador)
 Dwight Ferguson (against Grenada)

References

External links
North, Central America & Caribbean Zone at FIFA.com

 
CONCACAF
FIFA World Cup qualification (CONCACAF)
World Cup
World Cup
World Cup